InterNorth Inc. was a large energy company headquartered at the Northern Natural Gas Building in Omaha, Nebraska, in the United States, specializing in natural gas pipelines but also a force in the plastics industry, coal and petroleum exploration and production. It was a predecessor to Enron Corporation. 

InterNorth was founded in 1931 as Northern Natural Gas Company. Over the years, it acquired several other subsidiaries, such as Northern Liquid Fuels Company, Northern Petrochemicals Company, Northern Propane Gas Company, Northern Border Pipeline Company, and People's Natural Gas. In 1979, Northern Natural Gas reorganized as a holding company, InterNorth. They operated the largest natural gas pipeline in North America (approximately 36,000 miles of pipeline).   

In 1980-81, the company launched an unsolicited takeover bid for Crouse-Hinds Company, which wound up being acquired by Cooper Industries the following year.  The company continued to pursue expansion opportunities. In 1983, the company purchased the Belco Petroleum Company, a Fortune 500 oil exploration and development company founded by Arthur Belfer; and, in 1985, reached a deal, seen by some as overpriced, to acquire the smaller competitor Houston Natural Gas Company (HNG). InterNorth was an arbitrage target and acquired HNG as a poison pill. 

Following its takeover of HNG, InterNorth was briefly renamed HNG/Internorth. It was renamed Enteron briefly before becoming Enron six months later. 

Although intended to secure InterNorth's independence, the HNG takeover proved a "wag-the-dog" transaction: despite an initial plan for dual headquarters in Omaha and Houston, with InterNorth CEO Samuel Segnar in control, the company soon was based entirely in Houston and run by HNG's CEO, Ken Lay.  Initially, Lay and his secretary wanted to change the company's name to Enteron, due to the positive connotations of the words "enter" and "on', though it was soon discovered to be a Greek term for digestive system or intestine.  The markets reacted with hilarity and a month later he changed the name again to Enron, costing many millions in advertising, signage, stationery and contracts.  

The merged company was a target of corporate raider Irwin Jacobs of Minneapolis. Lay "borrowed" over $400 million from the employee stock ownership program to buy back Jacobs stock, so he could keep his job and cover other financial losses of Enron as early as 1987. Lay then froze the ESOP for seven years except for retirement or death benefits.

The most valuable asset of Internorth had been Northern Natural Gas, which was at one time the largest natural gas distributor in North America.  After the bankruptcy of Enron, Northern Natural Gas briefly became part of Dynegy Corp, whose chairman, Daniel Dienstbier, had been president of Northern before Ken Lay seized control of Internorth. Dynegy then sold Northern to Warren Buffett's Berkshire Hathaway who moved it back to Omaha.

References

Enron
Natural gas companies of the United States
Companies based in Omaha, Nebraska